The Wind Energy Power System (WEPS) is a wind farm project located near Puerto Galera, in the Philippine province of Mindoro Oriental. Once completed the project will generate an estimated 48MW of electricity.

Project details

The WEPS is located in the municipality of Puerto Galera, on the island of Mindoro. The project is being developed by Philippine Hybrid Energy Systems, Inc. a joint Philippine, Italian, and American developer. The first stage of development was approved in June 2011 by Philippine Energy Secretary Jose Almendras. This comes as part of the Philippine Government's ambitious energy policy.

On March 7, 2012, in Mindoro, Philippine President Aquino signed the Proposed Luzon Mindoro-Interconnection (LMI) project with the full support of Cong. Rudy Valencia, Cong. Rey Umali, Governor Alfonso Umali, and the Local Government of Mindoro. This agreement will allow for excess electricity to be transported to the nearby island of Luzon, home to the nation's capital and largest city Manila. "Before I end my term in 2016, I want to see Mindoro exporting its surplus power to Luzon," commented President Benigno Aquino III during a recent signing ceremony.

The project is being developed jointly by Philippine Hybrid Energy Systems, Inc. Italian power utility developer CMC Asia, Inc. and turbine manufacturer and building contractor Gamesa Eolica, S.L. Unipersonal of Spain.

References

Wind farms in the Philippines
Buildings and structures in Oriental Mindoro